Jérôme Palatsi (born 10 December 1969) is a French former footballer who played as a goalkeeper.

Having had no impact as a professional in his country of birth, he spent the bulk of his senior career in Portugal, appearing in 180 Primeira Liga matches mainly at the service of Vitória de Guimarães and retiring in his 40s.

Club career
Palatsi was born in Béziers, Hérault. After only three matches as a professional at Montpellier HSC over the course of five seasons (although two were spent on loan), he moved to the lower leagues in the country.

In 1996, Palatsi started a Portuguese adventure that would last nearly 15 years, starting at S.C. Beira-Mar. At the Aveiro club and his second, Vitória de Guimarães, he was sometimes charged with penalty-taking, scoring a total of four goals in the Primeira Liga.

From 2005 onwards, Palatsi played mostly in the country's Segunda Liga, first signing with Moreirense F.C. then moving to F.C. Penafiel. Aged almost 39, he returned to Beira-Mar also in that level, and retired two years later after a brief stint with amateurs A.A. Avanca.

With Beira-Mar again in the top flight, Palatsi returned to the club as goalkeeper coach. He also worked in that role with S.C. Freamunde and F.C. Felgueiras 1932. He was both head and assistant manager – as well as player – at Vitória de Guimarães's beach soccer team and acted as scout for Montpellier.

Honours
Le Grau-du-Roi
Division d'Honneur Languedoc-Roussillon: 1995–96

Beira-Mar
Taça de Portugal: 1998–99
Segunda Liga: 2009–10

References

External links

1969 births
Living people
Sportspeople from Béziers
French footballers
Footballers from Occitania (administrative region)
Association football goalkeepers
Ligue 1 players
Ligue 2 players
Division d'Honneur players
Montpellier HSC players
Olympique Alès players
FC Rouen players
Pau FC players
ES Grau-du-Roi players
Primeira Liga players
Liga Portugal 2 players
S.C. Beira-Mar players
Vitória S.C. players
Moreirense F.C. players
F.C. Penafiel players
French expatriate footballers
Expatriate footballers in Portugal
French expatriate sportspeople in Portugal